Tamara Medarts (born 23 February 1994) is a former Belgian Paralympic swimmer who competed in international level events. She was a World and European bronze medalist in breaststroke swimming and competed for Belgium at the 2012 Summer Paralympics where she reached the women's 100m breaststroke SB14 final but did not medal.

References

1994 births
Living people
Sportspeople from Genk
Paralympic swimmers of Belgium
Swimmers at the 2012 Summer Paralympics
Medalists at the World Para Swimming Championships
Medalists at the World Para Swimming European Championships
Belgian female breaststroke swimmers
S14-classified Paralympic swimmers